Anthony Brown may refer to:

Arts and entertainment
 Anthony Brown (gospel musician) (born 1981), American singer
 Anthony Brown (musician) (active 1997–2010), American jazz drummer
 Anthony Cave Brown (1929–2006), English-American journalist, espionage non-fiction writer, and historian
 Antony Barrington Brown (1927–2012), English photographer
 J. Anthony Brown, American comedian, actor and radio personality
 Anthony Brown, a fictional character in the 1975–1979 Japanese manga Candy Candy

Politics
 Anthony Brown (Kansas politician) (born 1968, active since 2005), member of the Kansas House of Representatives
 Tony Brown (Kansas politician) (born 1961), member of the Kansas House of Representatives
 Anthony Brown (Maryland politician) (born 1961), member of the U.S. House of Representatives from Maryland

Sports

American football
 Anthony Brown (offensive lineman) (born 1972), American football offensive lineman
 Anthony Brown (cornerback) (born 1993), American football cornerback
 Anthony Brown (quarterback), American football quarterback

Other sports
 Anthony Brown (basketball) (born 1992), American basketball player
 Anthony Brown (cricketer) (born 1961), Australian cricketer

Science and medicine
 Anthony Brown (scientist), born 1961, Dutch astronomer

See also 
Tony Brown (disambiguation)
Anthony Browne (disambiguation)
Antonio Brown (born 1988), American football wide receiver
Antonio Brown (wide receiver, born 1978)